Mario Nuzzolese  (10 December 1915 – 21 October 2008), was an Italian Lieutenant Colonel, teacher, journalist and film critic. He led the Italian cinema and entertainment culture. He contributed to the management and development of the National AGIS Association and managed the Regional Delegation for more than 40 years.

Military career

In 1942 he was sent with the rank of Lieutenant Colonel to defend the Italian trenches during World War II in the Africa Campaign on the El Alamein front, recruited by the Military Intelligence commanded by the Major Paolo Caccia Dominioni. During a battle he had a lucky landing in the Sahara Desert with his Fiat Cicogna that caused severe and irreversible vertebral injuries.

For the strategy, courage and seriousness he was awarded a Medal of Military Valor.

Cinema

In 1945 he started projecting silent movies in a little room of the School Balilla in Bari, allowing his students to explore the educational power of videos with his first censures.
During the early 1950s, in Bari, Nuzzolese directed the first B/W documentary on the Basilica di San Nicola of Bari, actually the property of the historical RAI Archives.
He devoted his life to the family and the cinema culture, ideated and founded Cinemas ABC (1976), one of the first essay cinemas in Europe inaugurated by Minister Adolfo Sarti with the movie "Quanto è bello lu murire acciso" of Ennio Lorenzini. The Centre of Culture liked too much also the Italian Film Director Carlo Lizzani, which permitted to print of 11 movies of the Venice Film Festival. It was reopened on 19 January 2010, after restoration and conservation interventions, with an honour plate to him dedicated.
He participated several times in the Annual Academy Awards, Festival de Cannes and Venice Film Festival. He founded associations to improve Italian Cinema's traditions and the target of its supporters, such as Agiscuola and FICE.
In 1980 he was awarded by the former President of the Council of Ministers, Francesco Cossiga, with the title of Commendatore della Repubblica and different times by the AGIS Association with several medals of honours for his loyalty, fidelity and positive results.
He collected original 8mm films, VHS, movie billboards and specialised magazines, creating the invaluable AGIS collection.

Journalism
He wrote several articles and film criticisms for the newspapers Corriere della Sera, Repubblica and Giornale dello Spettacolo; and socially divulged the essay cinema culture in television format.

Honours
 Commander of the Order of Merit of the Italian Republic
 Bronze Medal of Military Valor

References
 
 
 
 
 
 
 

1915 births
2008 deaths
Italian male journalists
Italian soldiers
People from Bari
Commanders of the Order of Merit of the Italian Republic
Recipients of the Bronze Medal of Military Valor
Italian film critics
20th-century Italian journalists
20th-century Italian male writers